John Joseph Barrett (December 18, 1915 – August 17, 1974) was an outfielder in Major League Baseball from 1942 to 1946. He played for the Pittsburgh Pirates and Boston Braves.

Barrett was born in Lowell, Massachusetts. He started his professional baseball career in 1937, in the Boston Red Sox organization. In 1940 and 1941, he played in the Pacific Coast League. He hit .313 in 1941 and was purchased by the Pirates after the season ended.

Barrett made his major league debut in 1942. He immediately broke into the starting lineup and stayed there until 1946. Regarded as one of the fastest runners in baseball, Barrett led the National League in stolen bases and triples in 1944. In 1946, however, he suffered a knee injury. He was traded to the Braves, and in 1947 he went back to the Pacific Coast League. He retired from baseball in 1951.

See also
 List of Major League Baseball annual stolen base leaders
 List of Major League Baseball annual triples leaders

References

External links

1915 births
1974 deaths
Major League Baseball outfielders
National League stolen base champions
Pittsburgh Pirates players
Boston Braves players
Hazleton Red Sox players
Scranton Red Sox players
San Francisco Seals (baseball) players
Hollywood Stars players
San Diego Padres players
Baseball players from Massachusetts
Sportspeople from Lowell, Massachusetts